Time Team Live is a British television series that airs on Channel 4.  The first programme was shown in 1997 and the most recent was in 2006. Presented by the actor Tony Robinson and guest presenters, this is a live version of the archaeology series Time Team, showing more of what happens in real time, than when the cut-down episode airs on Channel 4.

Background
Time Team Live episodes came from historically important sites. Instead of showing a 'best of' show, the live episodes were broadcast whilst the digs were actually taking place. Later, regular episodes were made from the best of the live episodes. Normally, regular sites were recorded in the same method, however, only a few were selected for live broadcast. The regular episodes were either a special, or a normal series episode.

Episodes

Series 1 (1997)
Guest presented by Sandi Toksvig and Hugh Fearnley-Whittingstall alongside Robinson. Edited into Time Team series 5, episode 4.

Series 2 (1998)
Guest presented by Sandi Toksvig and Hugh Fearnley-Whittingstall alongside Robinson. Edited into Time Team series 6, episode 11.

Series 3 (1999)
Guest presented by Sandi Toksvig and Paul Thompson alongside Robinson. Edited into Time Team series 7, episode 13, "York".

Series 4 (2000)
Guest presented by Sandi Toksvig and Liza Tarbuck alongside Robinson. Edited into Time Team series 8, episode 12, "Three Tales of Canterbury".

Series 5 (2001)
Guest presented by Sandi Toksvig and Alice Roberts alongside Robinson.  Edited into Time Team series 9, episode 13, "Seven Buckets and a Buckle".

The Big Dig (2003)
Time Team's Big Dig was an expansion on the live format. A weekend of live broadcasts in June 2003 was preceded by a week of daily short programmes. It involved about a thousand members of the public in excavating test pits each one metre square by fifty centimetres deep. Most of these pits were in private gardens and the project stirred up controversies about approaches to public archaeology. Edited into a Time Team special, "Big Dig, The Hole Story".

Big Roman Dig (2005)
Time Team's Big Roman Dig (2005) saw the "Big dig" format altered, in an attempt to avoid previous controversies, through the coverage of nine archaeological sites around the UK which were already under investigation by professional archaeologists. Time Team covered the action through live link-ups based at a Roman Villa at Dinnington in Somerset – itself a Time Team excavation from 2003. Over 60 other professionally supervised excavations were supported by Time Team and carried out around the country in association with the programme. A further hundred activities relating to Roman history were carried out by schools and other institutions around the UK.

Material from the Big Roman Dig relating to the Roman villa site at Dinnington, Somerset; along with material from the earlier episode at the same site - Time Team series 10, episode 2 "Mosaics, Mosaics, Mosaics" - was used in a Time Team Special, "The Big Roman Villa".

2005 Extras

Big Royal Dig (2006)
Edited into a Time Team special, "Big Royal Dig".

More4 Extras

See also
 List of Time Team episodes
 Time Team Specials
 Time Team Others

References

External links
Time Team at Channel4.com
Time Team Live 1997 Channel4.com "microsite" (archived)
Time Team Live 2000 Channel4.com "microsite" (archived)
Time Team Live 2001 Channel4.com "microsite" (archived)
Big Dig Channel4.com "microsite" (archived)
Big Roman Dig Channel4.com "microsite" (archived)
Big Royal Dig Channel4.com "microsite" (archived)
The Unofficial Time Team site Fan site (archived)
Time Team Teatime: Session 6 – 3rd May 2020, discussing Time Team Live 1998
Time Team Teatime: Session 24 – 27th September 2020, discussing Time Team Live 1999

1997 British television series debuts
2006 British television series endings
Channel 4 original programming
Time Team